In Search for Captain Grant is a 1986 Soviet 7 episodes television miniseries adaptation of Jules Verne's 1868 novel In Search of the Castaways directed by Stanislav Govorukhin. It was shot on the Odessa Film Studio and Bulgarian Boyana Film in 1985.

Plot 

The film consists of two subplots. The first tells about the life of the writer Jules Verne and the history of creation and publication of the novel In Search of the Castaways. The second actually narrates the novel.

Lord and Lady Glenarvan found in the sea a bottle with a letter from Captain Grant, whose ship was wrecked. After the refusal of the British government to conduct searches, The Glenarvans decide to find captain Grant themselves with Grant's children Mary and Robert.

Cast 
 Vladimir Smirnov as Jules Verne
 Marina Vlady as Marko Vovchok
 Lembit Ulfsak as Jacques Paganel
 Nikolai Yeremenko Jr. as Lord Glenarvan
 Tamara Akulova as Lady Glenarvan
 Vladimir Gostyukhin as Major McNabbs
 Oleg Stefan as Capt. John Mangles
 Ruslan Kurashov as Robert Grant
 Galina Strutinskaya as Mary Grant
 Anatoli Rudakov as Olbinett
 Boris Khmelnitsky as Captain Grant
 Kosta Tsonev as Hetzel
 Aleksandr Abdulov as Bob the Tar
 Fyodor Odinokov as Paddy O'Moore

Filming locations
 The film scenes were filmed mostly around Black Sea region in Bulgaria, Crimea
 The initial scene with the hot air balloon was filmed near the city of Rylsk, Russian SFSR
 Part of crossing the Patagonia was staged at Belogradchik Rocks near Belogradchik, Bulgaria and the Caucasus near the town of Dombay, Russian SFSR
 Ship scenes were filmed on several ships including the German-built barque Tovarisch, the Finish-built schooners Kodor, and Zarya.

List of episodes
 With Jules Verne around the World
 The 37th parallel
 Talkaw
 The Golden God
 Ben Joyce
 Imprisoned by cannibals
 Robinson of Oceania

References

External links 
 

1986 films
Films based on works by Jules Verne
Soviet television miniseries
Odesa Film Studio films
1980s Russian-language films
Films directed by Stanislav Govorukhin
1980s Soviet television series
Soviet adventure films
Russian adventure films
1980s adventure films
1980s television miniseries